The 1988 Westminster Titans football team was an American football team that represented Westminster College of Pennsylvania as an independent during the 1988 NAIA Division II football season. In their 17th season under head coach Joe Fusco, the Titans compiled a perfect 14–0 record.

Schedule

NAIA Division II playoffs

First round vs. Austin
The Titans won, 34–12. Sophomore running back Brad Tokar tallied 167 rushing yards in the game. Quarterback Joe Micchia completed seven of 19 passes for 111 yards and two touchdowns with no interceptions. The Titans out-gained the Kangaroos by 432 yards of total offense to 226.

Quarterfinal vs. Bluffton
On November 26, Westminster defeated , 40–7, in the quarterfinals of the playoffs. Westminster recovered three Bluffton fumbles (two by Andre Borowicz) in the first quarter and converted each of them into touchdowns, taking a 21–0 lead at the end of the quarter. Brad Tokar rushed for 152 yards on 20 carries.

Semifinal at Evangel
On December 3, Westminster defeated , 26–9, in the NAIA Division II semifinal game at Briggs Stadium in Springfield, Missouri. Westminster  tight end Jeff Hahn caught two touchdown passes and was named the game's most valuable player. Evangel quarterback Don Decker was intercepted five times.

Championship game vs. Wisconsin–La Crosse
On December 11, Westminster defeated , 21–14, in the NAIA Division II national championship game at Memorial Field in New Wilmington, Pennsylvania. Westminster quarterback Joe Micchia completed 22 of 44 passes for 302 yards and three touchdowns passes to wide receiver David Foley. Micchia had been battling the flu and spent the day before the game in infirmary. Micchia threw his first touchdown pass with 16 seconds remaining in the first half to tie the score at 7–7. With 3:35 remaining in the game, Micchia threw a 20-yard touchdown pass to Foley, tying the score at 14–14. Westminster forced a punt and got the ball back with 2:38 remaining. On fourth down, Micchia threw the game-winning touchdown pass to Foley for 33 yards. After the game, coach Fusco said: "I've never been in a game like that, not in a national championship game, not with an ending like that."

References

Westminster
Westminster Titans football seasons
NAIA Football National Champions
Westminster Titans football